Dale is an unincorporated community in Guthrie County, Iowa, United States.

History
Dale was laid out in 1856 by John Lonsdale. A post office operated in Dale from 1852 to 1922.

Dale was formerly called Allen from 1852 to 1856, Morrisburgh from 1856 to 1865, and Dale City from 1865 to 1883 before its current name.

References

Unincorporated communities in Iowa
Unincorporated communities in Guthrie County, Iowa
1856 establishments in Iowa
Populated places established in 1856